NK Mladost Ždralovi is a Croatian professional football club in the village of Ždralovi, near city of Bjelovar. The club was founded in 1933. One of the biggest victories was against NK Inter Zaprešić 3:1. In 2021. they had the opportunity to go to the 2. HNL, but NK Jarun knocked them out with a score of 1:0. In the season 2021/22. they compete in the 3. HNL - North.

Honours 
 Treća HNL – North:
Winners (2): 2011–12, 2012–13, 2020-2021

Current squad 

Football clubs in Croatia
Football clubs in Bjelovar-Bilogora County
Association football clubs established in 1933
1933 establishments in Croatia